Fabrício dos Santos Messias or simply Fabrício (born 28 March 1990) is a Brazilian football player who is currently playing for China League One club Guangxi Pingguo Haliao.

Club career
Fabrício started his career in Corinthians and was loaned to Capivariano, Ituano and Juventude to gain experience. Fabrício transferred to Botafogo in 2011. He transferred to Portuguese Liga de Honra club Portimonense in July. Fabrício made his debut for Portimonense on 21 August, in a 2-0 away league victory against Moreirense. He scored his first and the only goal for the Portuguese club in the second round of Taça de Portugal which Portimonense beat Sourense 3-0. Fabrício moved to Chinese Super League side Hangzhou Greentown in January 2012 on a loan deal.

Career statistics

References

External links

1990 births
Living people
Brazilian footballers
Association football midfielders
Sport Club Corinthians Paulista players
Ituano FC players
Esporte Clube Juventude players
Botafogo de Futebol e Regatas players
Portimonense S.C. players
Zhejiang Professional F.C. players
Sport Club Barueri players
Kashima Antlers players
Urawa Red Diamonds players
Primeira Liga players
Liga Portugal 2 players
Chinese Super League players
J1 League players
Brazilian expatriate footballers
Brazilian expatriate sportspeople in China
Brazilian expatriate sportspeople in Portugal
Expatriate footballers in China
Expatriate footballers in Portugal
Expatriate footballers in Japan